Laurie Lambert (born 18 November 1960) is a Canadian former field hockey player who competed in the 1984 Summer Olympics.

References

External links
 

1960 births
Living people
Canadian female field hockey players
Olympic field hockey players of Canada
Field hockey players at the 1984 Summer Olympics
20th-century Canadian women
21st-century Canadian women